Charade is the first album by a new group from former members of the band Bonfire.  It was released in 1998 by Bareknuckle.  The album was originally recorded in 1993 by the group when they were known as Bonfire.  When Claus Lessmann left the band, Michael Bormann joined and recorded this album.  It was shelved by the band's record company and the group went their separate ways.  After Claus Lessmann and Hans Ziller purchased the rights to the name of Bonfire and music from 1986 to 1991, Michael Bormann and Angel Schleifer decided to give the previously shelved album a chance.  It was picked up by a Japanese record company and under a new name it was released.  Jörg Deisinger and Edgar Patrik provide the bass and drums to the album but declined to be included in the line-up.  In 2004 it was re-released with Charade's second album.  In addition to the music, there is a file encoded on the disc that brings up Avex Incorporated's web site.

Track listing

Band members
Michael Bormann - lead vocals, acoustic guitar
Angel Schleifer - lead guitars, keyboards, programming

1998 albums
Bonfire (band) albums